The 1976 Minnesota Senate election was held in the U.S. state of Minnesota on November 2, 1976, to elect members to the Senate of the 70th and 71st Minnesota Legislatures. A primary election was held on September 14, 1976. This was the first partisan election of the Senate since 1910.

The Minnesota Democratic–Farmer–Labor Party (DFL) won a majority of seats, followed by the Independent-Republicans of Minnesota. The new Legislature convened on January 4, 1977.

The Republican Party of Minnesota had changed its name to the Independent-Republican Party of Minnesota on November 15, 1975.

Results

See also
 Minnesota House of Representatives election, 1976
 Minnesota gubernatorial election, 1974

References

1976 Minnesota elections
Minnesota
Minnesota Senate elections